"The Last Time" is a song by American singer-songwriter Taylor Swift featuring Northern Irish singer Gary Lightbody, taken from the former's fourth studio album, Red (2012). Swift, Lightbody, and Jacknife Lee wrote the song, with the lattermost producing it. On Red, Swift wanted to experiment with different producers beyond her career base in Nashville, Tennessee. To this extent, she reached out to Lightbody and Lee, members of the rock band Snow Patrol, inspired by their music about loss and heartbreak.

"The Last Time" was released in the United Kingdom for the week of November 4, 2013, as a single from Red. Combining alternative rock and folk, "The Last Time" is a power ballad featuring dramatic string instruments and an orchestral background in the refrain. Lyrically, Swift's and Lightbody's characters tell about their perspectives on a failed relationship, torn between heartbreak and forgiveness.

In Red album reviews, music critics appreciated "The Last Time" for its production and Lightbody's performance, but some felt that Lightbody's and Swift's vocals do not complement each other. Retrospectively, critics have considered it one of Swift's weakest songs in her discography. "The Last Time" reached the top 30 on the singles charts in Ireland, Scotland, and the United Kingdom. A re-recorded version, "The Last Time (Taylor's Version)", was included on Swift's re-recorded album Red (Taylor's Version), released on November 12, 2021.

Background and release
Swift released her third studio album, Speak Now, in October 2010. She wrote the album by herself and co-produced it with Nathan Chapman. Speak Now was similar to Swift's previous album, Fearless (2008), in its country pop production style. On her fourth studio album, Red (2012), Swift wanted to experiment with other musical styles. To this end, she approached different producers beyond her career base in Nashville, Tennessee. Swift worked with musicians Gary Lightbody and Jacknife Lee of the Irish-Scottish band Snow Patrol, admiring their sentimental music "about loss or longing". She was connected with Lightbody by their mutual friend, English singer-songwriter Ed Sheeran, when they were recording in the studio one day. The song that Swift and Lightbody worked on together for Red is "The Last Time", which features Lightbody on guest vocals and Lee on writing and producing.

"The Last Time" was released commercially as part of the album Red, on October 22, 2012, by Big Machine Records. It was released as a single in the United Kingdom for the week of November 4, 2013, by Mercury Records. Swift and Lightbody performed the track live during the Sacramento, California, concert of Swift's Red Tour on August 27, 2013—their first time singing live together. The performance was recorded by director Terry Richardson and released as the song's live music video on November 15, 2013. The pair performed the song once again on the tenth season of British version of The X Factor on November 3, 2013.

Composition and lyrics
"The Last Time" is a power ballad. Lewis Randy of the Los Angeles Times said that it is an alternative rock song, following the musical style of Snow Patrol. Reviews from The Philippine Inquirer and The Daily Telegraph categorized the song as folk, with a relatively dark production compared to Red upbeat tracks. The refrain is accentuated by an orchestral background consisting of strings and brass. The track ends with a strings-laden coda. The strings were arranged and conducted by Owen Pallett. Musicologist James E. Perone noted that "The Last Time" uses the '50s progression, I–vi–IV–V, which is associated with many American pop songs from the 1950s; Perone argued that this quality lent "The Last Time" a timeless feel. He further remarked that the orchestral stringed instruments are reminiscent of the music by the 1970s and early-1980s group Electric Light Orchestra.

The lyrics tell the story of a crumbling relationship, with the two narrators detailing a vicious cycle of heartbreak and forgiveness. Swift said she was inspired to write "The Last Time" by a relationship with an unreliable ex-lover, "You never know when he's going to leave, you never know when he's going to come back, but he always does come back." Swift imagined a scenario where outside a door is a boyfriend on his knees on the ground, with the girlfriend waiting inside the room, torn between allowing him to come back or not, after having been heartbroken many times. The song features both Lightbody and Swift on lead vocals; Lightbody sings of his character's perspective on the failed relationship in the first verse, followed by Swift's presentation of her character's in the second. Swift recalled, "It's a really fragile emotion you're dealing with when you want to love someone, but you don't know if it's smart to."

Critical reception

In album reviews of Red, some critics selected "The Last Time" as an album highlight. Joseph Atilano of The Philippine Inquirer considered it the most mature album track because it "proves [Swift] is ready for the adult-pop realm", which lends her artistic credibility. Allison Stewart from The Washington Post similarly lauded it as an album standout, opining that Lightbody's creative input helped Swift accordingly develop her artistry in experimenting with styles beyond country-pop. Sharing the same sentiment, James Lachno from The Daily Telegraph commended the production and vocals: "[The song] digs into a hidden side to [Swift's] talent." Reviews from Mesfin Fekadu of the Associated Press and Michelle Prosser Times Record News considered "The Last Time" an album highlight, specifically thanks to Lightbody's performance. Randall Roberts of The Los Angeles Times praised the track as "well-crafted" and the refrain as "instantly hummable".

Other reviewers were less complimentary, taking issue with the duo's vocal performance. Billy Dukes of Taste of Country was more critical of the song, as he felt Lightbody dominates the track and Swift "stretches out in the back seat"; he called "The Last Time" the "only pure skip-ahead moment" on Red. Perone commented that Lightbody's vocals fit the song better than Swift's, who performs with "a sense of urgency in her singing". In a negative review, James Reed from The Boston Globe criticized the duo's singing: "his morose croon sounds dreary alongside her thin, unadorned vocals." Tony Clayton-Lea writing for The Irish Times deemed the track and "Everything Has Changed" featuring Ed Sheeran, the other collaboration effort on Red, as Swift's "desperate attempts" to reach out to new audiences.

Retrospective rankings have considered "The Last Time" one of Swift's weakest songs in her discography. Rob Sheffield of Rolling Stone, in a 2021 ranking of Swift's 206-song catalog, ranked the track at number 197; he commented that Swift's and Lightbody's vocals do not complement each other. In another 2021 ranking of Swift's 179 songs, Nate Jones from Vulture placed it at number 170 and remarked that it is Red worst song, criticizing the production "that you've got to slog through to get to the end". Billboard placed it last on a ranking of all Swift's collaboration singles, deeming it forgettable. Alexis Petridis in The Guardian was more positive, placing "The Last Time" 29th out of 44 singles Swift released in a 2019 ranking; while saying that it is not a bad song, Petridis commented that it is not one of Swift's most memorable singles.

Commercial performance
Upon Red's release, "The Last Time" peaked at number three on the Bubbling Under Hot 100 Singles chart dated November 10, 2012. During the same time frame, the song charted at number 73 on the Canadian Hot 100 chart. In the United Kingdom, "The Last Time" debuted and peaked at number 25 on the UK Singles Chart for the week of November 10, 2013. The track charted in the top 20 on the singles charts in Ireland and Scotland.

Personnel
Adapted from Red liner notes

Production

 Taylor Swift – lead vocals, songwriter
 Gary Lightbody – featured vocals, songwriter
 Jacknife Lee – producer, songwriter, guitar
 Mark Stent – mixer
 Matty Green – assistant mixer
 Chris Owens – assistant recording engineer
 Matt Bishop – engineer, editor
 Sam Bell – engineer
 Hank Williams – mastering

Musicians

 Owen Pallett – conductor
 Bill Rieflin – drums
 Marcia Dickstein – harp
 Jamie Muhoberac – piano
 Jeff Takiguchi – upright bass
 Simeon Pillich – upright bass
 John Krovoza – cello
 Peggy Baldwin – cello
 Richard Dodd – cello
 Brett Banducci – viola
 Lauren Chipman – viola
 Rodney Wirtz – viola
 Amy Wickman – violin
 Daphne Chen – violin
 Eric Gorfain – violin
 Gina Kronstadt – violin
 Marisa Kuney – violin
 Neli Nikolaeva – violin
 Radu Pieptea – violin
 Wes Precourt – violin

Charts

"The Last Time (Taylor's Version)"

Following a dispute with Big Machine over the rights to the master recordings of Swift's first six studio albums, Swift re-recorded the whole Red album and released it as Red (Taylor's Version) under Republic Records on November 11, 2021; the re-recording of "The Last Time" is titled "The Last Time (Taylor's Version)". Lightbody and Lee both returned on the re-recording as guest vocalist and producer, respectively. The re-recording peaked at number 53 on the Canadian Hot 100 and  number 66 on the US Billboard Hot 100. On the Billboard Global 200, it peaked at number 61. In a review of Red (Taylor's Version) for USA Today, Melissa Ruggieri found "The Last Time" one of the album's most beautiful songs, praising its "hushed beauty".

Personnel
Adapted from Red (Taylor's Version) album liner notes
 Taylor Swift – lead vocals, songwriter
 Gary Lightbody – lead vocals, songwriter, guitar
 Jacknife Lee – producer, songwriter, recording engineer, programming, bass, keyboard, piano, guitar
 Matt Bishop – recording engineer
 Christopher Rowe – vocal engineer
 John Hanes – recording engineer
 Bryce Bordone – assistant mixer
 Serban Ghenea – mixer
 Matt Bishop – editor
 Davide Rossi – cello, viola, violin, strings arranger
 Matt Bishop – drums
 Owen Pallett – strings arranger

Charts

References

Source

Taylor Swift songs
2012 songs
2013 singles
2010s ballads
Alternative rock ballads
Songs written by Taylor Swift
Songs written by Gary Lightbody
Songs written by Jacknife Lee
Song recordings produced by Jacknife Lee
Big Machine Records singles
Music videos directed by Terry Richardson
Folk ballads
American folk songs
American alternative rock songs